The 1992 Army Cadets football team was an American football team that represented the United States Military Academy in the 1992 NCAA Division I-A football season. In their second season under head coach Bob Sutton, the Cadets compiled a 5–6 record and were outscored by their opponents by a combined total of 251 to 225.  In the annual Army–Navy Game, the Cadets defeated Navy, 25–24.

Schedule

Personnel

Not listed (missing number/class/position): Aaron Mitchell, Chris Shaw (holder)

Season summary

Lafayette

Eastern Michigan

vs Navy

References

Army
Army Black Knights football seasons
Army Cadets football